Castle Risk is a version of the board game Risk that is played on a map of Europe. It was first released as a stand-alone game by Parker Brothers in 1986 and later appeared on the reverse side of the board in an early 1990s version of the standard Risk game.

Map
The map is divided into six empires and three neutral areas. A player receives four troops per turn for each empire the player controls and six troops for controlling all the neutral areas. A common variation in play is to have each of the neutral regions worth two troops a turn.

Empires:
French Empire (Paris, Gascony, Netherlands, Brittany, Marseille, Burgundy)
British Empire (London, Wales, Ireland, Yorkshire, Scotland)
Russian Empire (Saint Petersburg, Moscow, Livonia, Smolensk, Ukraine, Poland)
German Empire (Prussia, Berlin, Saxony, Rhine, Bavaria)
Ottoman Empire (Turkey, Montenegro, Serbia, Romania, Bulgaria, Greece)
Austrian Empire (Trieste, Galicia, Vienna, Bohemia, Hungary)

Neutral territories:
Italy (Switzerland, Venice, Rome, Naples)
Spain (Barcelona, Madrid, Portugal)
Scandinavia (Sweden, Norway, Denmark, Finland)

Rules
The rules of Castle Risk differ from original Risk in several respects. Each empire has a capital city (of the player's choosing) and once the capital is lost that player is out of the game. In addition, reinforcements are granted at the end of a turn instead of at the beginning (except in the case of the Reinforcements card). This makes fortifying the territory a player has just conquered much easier, but denies that player the opportunity to place the new troops in the best strategic position for the turn about to begin.

Castle Risk introduces specific person cards. The cards allow players to modify dice rolls (General and Marshall), to attack by sea instead of land (Admiral), place extra armies at the start of a turn (Reinforcements), force temporary non-aggression pacts (Diplomats), or to look at another player's cards, discarding one in the process (Spy).

Another new rule is the addition of "hidden armies", which are reinforcements that a player hides in a location of their choosing at the beginning of the game. They can be in any location, including an opponent's territory (except their own or an opponent's capital), which makes them very useful for launching a surprise attack.  Hidden armies can only be withdrawn at the beginning of a players' turn and the player must have control of the territory at the start of their turn.  Their power, when revealed, is based on the number of reinforcements cards that have already been played.

External links

Official rules of Castle Risk (PDF file)

References

Board games introduced in 1986
Risk (game)
Parker Brothers games